Puerto Rico v. Sanchez Valle, 579 U.S. ___ (2016), is a criminal case that came before the Supreme Court of the United States, which considered whether Puerto Rico and the federal government of the United States are separate sovereigns for purposes of the Double Jeopardy Clause of the United States Constitution.

In essence, the clause establishes that an individual cannot be tried for the same offense twice under the same sovereignty.

The petitioner claimed that Puerto Rico has a different sovereignty because of its political status while others claimed that it does not, including the respondent, the Supreme Court of Puerto Rico, and the Solicitor General of the United States.

In a 6–2 decision, the Court affirmed that the Double Jeopardy Clause bars Puerto Rico and the United States from successively prosecuting the same person for the same conduct under equivalent criminal laws.

The decision was affirmed 6-2 in an opinion by Justice Kagan on June 9, 2016. Justice Ginsburg filed a concurring opinion in which Justice Thomas joined. Justice Thomas filed an opinion, concurring in part and concurring in the judgment.

Justice Breyer filed a dissenting opinion in which Justice Sotomayor joined.

Political implications 
The argument appears to diminish the constitutional stature that the Puerto Rican government thought that it had since the Puerto Rico Federal Relations Act of 1950 and subsequent ratification of the Constitution of Puerto Rico in 1952.

See also 
 Insular Cases
 PROMESA

References

External links
 

2016 in United States case law
United States Supreme Court cases
United States Supreme Court cases of the Roberts Court
United States Double Jeopardy Clause case law
Legal history of Puerto Rico